Channing Tatum is an American actor, producer and dancer who has received numerous accolades throughout his career.

Tatum had his breakthrough year in 2006, thanks to the releases of the films Step Up, She's the Man and A Guide to Recognizing Your Saints. For his performance in the lattermost feature, he received nominations for the Gotham Award for Breakthrough Performer and the Independent Spirit Award for Best Supporting Male, while he was honored along with the cast at the Sundance Film Festival. For Step Up and She's the Man, he earned wins at the 2006 and 2007 Teen Choice Awards.

Tatum starred as Greg Jenko in the film 21 Jump Street (2012) and its sequel 22 Jump Street (2014), for which he received two nominations for the Critics' Choice Movie Award for Best Actor in a Comedy and won an MTV Movie Award for Best Comedic Performance. He is also known for his performance as the stripper Michael "Magic Mike" Lane in the films Magic Mike (2012) and Magic Mike XXL (2015), receiving further nominations at the MTV Movie & TV Awards and the Teen Choice Awards for the role.

He received critical acclaim for his acting in the films Foxcatcher (2014) and The Hateful Eight (2015), winning an ensemble award at the Independent Spirit Awards for the former and receiving a nomination for the Critics' Choice Movie Award for Best Acting Ensemble for the latter.

Awards and nominations

Notes

References

External links 
  

Tatum, Channing